The barony of Castleknock ( meaning "Cnucha's Castle") is one of the baronies of Ireland. Originally part of the Lordship of Meath, it was then constituted as part of the historic County Dublin. Today, it lies in the modern county of Fingal, Ireland. The barony was originally also a feudal title, which became one of the subsidiary titles of the Viscounts Gormanston.

History
The barony was created by Hugh de Lacy, Lord of Meath, as his own feudal barony, to be held directly from himself in capite (his vassals were commonly called "De Lacy's Barons"). The first vassal was Hugh Tyrrel in 1177. It was held for three and a half knight's fees, owed to the superior Lord of Fingal. The title and lands of Castleknock were held by the Tyrell family until 1370 when Robert Tyrell, the eighth Baron and his wife died of the plague, leaving two daughters and co-heiresses, Joan and Matilda. The lands later passed to the Viscount Gormanston.

Location
At the heart of the barony is the civil parish of the same name - Castleknock - which is one of eight civil parishes in the barony. In the townland of Castleknock itself is the location of the eponymous "Cnucha's Castle" - Castleknock Castle. The town with the biggest population in the barony is Blanchardstown. It is one of seven and a half baronies that used to comprise the old county of Dublin. It stretches from Cabra to Blanchardstown (from east to west) and from Finglas to Chapelizod (from north to south).

The Castleknock barony is located between the baronies of Coolock to the east, Nethercross to the north and Dublin to the southeast. The River Liffey separates it from the remaining baronies of County Dublin. With the exception of the parish of Chapelizod, the remainder of the barony is contained within the modern county of Fingal and it is subject to Fingal County Council.

Legal context
Baronies were created after the Norman invasion of Ireland as subdivisions of counties and were used for administration. At the time of its creation, Castleknock was part of the Lordship of Meath. While baronies continue to be officially defined units, they are no longer used for many administrative purposes. While they have been administratively obsolete since 1898, they continue to be used in land registration, and specifications such as in planning permissions. In many cases, a barony corresponds to an earlier Gaelic túath which had submitted to the Crown. This is probably true in the case of Castleknock.

Civil parishes

Civil parish of Castleknock
What is now the parish of Castleknock was granted to Hugh Tyrrel by Hugh de Lacy, Lord of Meath. Copies of the grant were discovered in the London Public Records Office in 1933 by Eric St. John Brooks. In English, the grant reads:Henry, by the grace of God, King of England, Lord of Ireland, Duke of Aquitaine and Normandy and Count of Anjou to the Archbishops, Bishops, Ministers and all Earls, Barons, Justices, Sheriffs, Ministers and all his faithful French, English and Irish, greeting. Know that I have conceded, given, and by present Charter confirmed to Hugh Tirel, the man of Hugh de Lacy, Thwothyn and Thwothrom.

Brooks deduces that "Thwo" is an Anglicisation of the Gaelic word túath and that "throm" is an Anglicisation of the word droma which means ridge or hill - a possible reference to the hill of Castleknock where Tyrrell was to build his castle.

Townlands in the civil parish of Castleknock:

 Not to be confused with Huntstown in Mulhuddart.

Civil parish of Chapelizod
Chapelizod contains a single townland of the same name. However, 465 acres are within the walls of the Phoenix Park while the village proper, outside the walls, contains only 67 acres. It is the only part of the barony that is not within the modern county of Fingal. It is administered by Dublin City Council.

Civil parish of Cloghran
The parish of Cloghran consists of three townlands. Most of the land in the parish is taken up with the "Ballycoolen Industrial Estate".

Civil parish of Clonsilla
Townlands in the civil parish of Clonsilla:

Note 1 The largest population centre in Castaheany / Hansfield is Ongar.

Civil parish of Finglas
The 34 townlands of the parish of Finglas are split among two baronies. The core village and two smaller parcels of land - exclaves of the village - lie in Castleknock. An additional exclave lies in Nethercross.

Civil parish of Mulhuddart
Mulhuddart has 22 townlands, including:

Civil parish of Saint James'
The bulk of Saint James' parish lies south of the River Liffey. A single townland, situated north of the river in the Phoenix Park, is part of the barony of Castleknock.
 Saint James' (part of Phoenix Park); the eastern part containing the Magazine Fort, the Zoological Gardens, the Wellington Monument and the Criminal Courts of Justice.

Civil parish of Saint Judes'
The bulk of Saint Judes' parish lies south of the River Liffey. A single townland, situated north of the river, is part of the barony of Castleknock. It was carved out of the parish of Saint James'.
 Longmeadows which is the strip of land between the Park walls and the river from its narrowest pinch point to Islandbridge on the South Circular Road.

Civil parish of Ward
Townlands in the parish of Ward: Cherryhound, Irishtown, Killamonan, Newpark, Spricklestown, Ward Lower and Ward Upper.

See also
 List of subdivisions of County Dublin

References
From :

Civil parishes

Townlands of Cloghran

Townlands of Clonsilla

Townlands of Mulhuddart

Townlands of Saint James's

Townlands of Castleknock

Townlands of Ward

Townlands of other parishes

Other sources:

External links
 Local Government Act, 2001
  Source given is "Ordnance survey".

 
History of Fingal